Benjamin Imeh is a footballer from Nigeria playing as a striker. He has played in many Polish clubs

External links
 

1982 births
Living people
Nigerian footballers
Ekstraklasa players
Polonia Warsaw players
Arka Gdynia players
Śląsk Wrocław players
Tur Turek players
Zawisza Bydgoszcz players
Nigerian expatriate footballers
Enyimba F.C. players
Nigerian expatriate sportspeople in Poland
Expatriate footballers in Poland
Association football forwards